{{Infobox television
| image         = Pepee.JPG
| genre         = Preschool education
| runtime       = 10–30 minutes
| company       = Düşyeri
| distributor   =
| creator       = Ayşe Şule Bilgiç
| voices        = 
| composer      = Kiraç
| country       = Turkey
| language      = TurkishEnglish
| network       = 
| audio_format  = 
| opentheme     = 
| endtheme      = 
| first_aired   = 
| last_aired    = 
| num_seasons   = 8
| num_episodes  = 208
| list_episodes = 
| related       = {{Plainlist|
 Pocoyo
 Oddbods
 Leliko}} 
}}Pepee'' is a Turkish 3D animation television series produced by Düşyeri for Show TV. The series was created by Ayşe Şule Bilgiç. The first episode aired as a preview on June 6, 2008.

Characters 
 Pepee: is the main character of the series. He is a young boy full of curiosity who loves to play games and discover new things. He is very acrobatic and moves at a quick speed. He is always shown wearing blue clothes and a hat. His best friends are Şila, Zulu, and Şuşu.
 Şuşu (pronounced Shu-shu): speaks over the entire show, and often communicates directly with the characters. Pepee has a good relationship with her, and is always to delighted to see (hear) her. She is reminiscent of Portuguese and Spanish language Brazilian children's program presenter Xuxa (pronounced "Şuşa" or "Shu-sha").
 Bebee: Pepee's sister.

Legal trouble

In 2013, Zinkia, the company who licenses the Spanish cartoon character Pocoyo, brought a lawsuit against Düsyeri for copyright infringement of their character, claiming among other things that even the name is Spanish.

Series overview

International release

References

Turkish animated television series
2008 Turkish television series debuts
2000s animated television series
2010s animated television series
2000s Turkish television series
2010s Turkish television series
Turkish Radio and Television Corporation original programming
Show TV original programming
Television shows set in Turkey